Cyrille Ndaney (born 19 January 1989) is a Cameroonian professional footballer who plays for Canon Yaoundé.

Honours
ES Sétif
 Algerian Cup: 2011–12
 Algerian Ligue Professionnelle 1: 2011–12

References

External links
 

1989 births
Algerian Ligue Professionnelle 1 players
Cameroonian footballers
Cameroonian expatriate footballers
Living people
CS Sedan Ardennes players
ES Sétif players
USM Bel Abbès players
Sofapaka F.C. players
Al-Shamal SC players
Haras El Hodoud SC players
Canon Yaoundé players
Egyptian Premier League players
Association football forwards
Expatriate footballers in France
Expatriate footballers in Algeria
Expatriate footballers in Qatar
Expatriate footballers in Egypt
Cameroonian expatriate sportspeople in France
Cameroonian expatriate sportspeople in Algeria
Cameroonian expatriate sportspeople in Qatar
Cameroonian expatriate sportspeople in Egypt